P.S. Mr. Cole is a tribute album by jazz guitarist and vocalist John Pizzarelli, along with his trio of brother Martin Pizzarelli on double-bass and Ray Kennedy on piano. The album contains covers of Nat King Cole songs as well as an original composition titled "That's Nat". It was Pizzarelli's second album of Nat King Cole covers, after the 1994 album Dear Mr. Cole.

Track listing 
Walkin' My Baby Back Home     
Candy   
Welcome To The Club     
Indiana    
I Love You For Sentimental Reasons  
Don't Let it Go To Your Head     
Meet Me At No Special Place   
The Late Late Show     
Smile  
Tenderly    
I Was A Little Too Lonely     
I'm An Errand Boy For Rhythm     
Then I'll Be Tired Of You     
That's Nat   
Azure-Te   
I Know That You Know    
Embraceable You     
I Like Jersey Best

Personnel
John Pizzarellivocals, guitar
Ray Kennedypiano
Martin Pizzarellidouble-bass
Harry Allen - tenor saxophone on "Don't Let It Go To Your Head" and "Then I'll Be Tired of You"

References

1999 albums
John Pizzarelli albums
Vocal jazz albums
RCA Records albums
Nat King Cole tribute albums